The Oklahoma Emergency Response Act (27A O.S. Section 4-1-101 – 4-1-106) is an Oklahoma state law governing emergency response through the state.  The act creates a network for rapid response to hazardous material incidents and other events that threaten the public health and safety. It is also used to respond to dangerous threats to the natural environment of the state.

The Emergency Response Act was signed into law by Governor David Walters on July 1, 1993.

See also
Oklahoma Emergency Management Act of 2003
Catastrophic Health Emergency Powers Act
Oklahoma Emergency Interim Executive and Judicial Succession Act
Oklahoma Emergency Management Interim Legislative Succession Act

Emergency Response
Oklahoma
1993 in Oklahoma